Cabin Creek is a stream in the U.S. state of South Dakota.

Cabin Creek was named for an abandoned cabin near its banks.

See also
List of rivers of South Dakota

References

Rivers of Perkins County, South Dakota
Rivers of South Dakota